During the 1996–97 English football season, Chesterfield competed in the Football League Second Division.

Season summary
For much of the season Chesterfield were in the Second Division play-off race, but a late slump saw them fall off the pace before a resurgence at the end of the season took them up to tenth - five points off the play-offs. In the FA Cup, Chesterfield reached the semi-finals for the first time in their history, before being knocked out by Premier League side Middlesbrough.

Final league table

Results
Chesterfield's score comes first

Legend

Football League Second Division

FA Cup

League Cup

Football League Trophy

Squad

Left club during season

References

Chesterfield F.C. seasons
Chesterfield